Black sesame soup (sesame tong sui) is a popular  Chinese dessert widely available throughout China. It is typically served hot. In Cantonese cuisine it takes the form of tong sui, or sweet soup (similar to Western  pudding), with greater viscosity. The main ingredients are black sesame seeds, rice and water.  Sugar is added for sweetness. Tangyuan is sometimes added into black sesame soup. Black sesame soup can be purchased in powder form.

Ingredients 

The main ingredients are:
white rice (long grain or short grain),
toasted black sesame seeds,
water (amount depending on the desired consistency), and
granulated sugar (based on personal preferences).

Additional ingredients are often added to this soup such as: caviar, millet, black rice, barley, corn, black beans, red beans, soy beans, yam or other whole grains.

Nutrition 

The soup offers useful quantities of Iron, magnesium, manganese, copper, calcium, vitamin B1, vitamin E,  phytic acid,  phytosterols and sesamin.

Calories per serving of black sesame seed soup (serving size 1 cup) is about 213 calories (128 calories from sesame seeds, 61 calories from granulated sugar, 24 calories from white rice).

Traditional Chinese medicinal practices use sesame to warm the body, replenish blood, relax bowels and nourish hair. It is said to be suitable for the treatment of physical weakness such as anemia, constipation, dizziness and tinnitus.

See also 
 Heugimja-juk
 List of Chinese soups
 List of sesame seed dishes
 List of soups
 Red bean soup

References 

Chinese desserts
Chinese soups
Sesame dishes